Trichasaurus is an extinct genus of caseid synapsids.

See also
 List of pelycosaurs

References

 The main groups of non-mammalian synapsids at Mikko's Phylogeny Archive

Prehistoric synapsid genera
Permian synapsids of North America
Taxa named by Samuel Wendell Williston
Fossil taxa described in 1913